Athina Sat was a Cypriot digital satellite pay television service owned by the limited company of the same name. Launched in May 2005 and was the first Cypriot-owned DTH satellite provider in Cyprus. It was one of two satellite platforms, the other being Nova.

Athina Sat offered Cypriot subscribers an array of programming choices from News, Sports, Movies, Children's, Entertainment as well as popular Cypriot TV networks.

In March 2008 Athinsat decided to shut its doors due to the loss of several channels, including popular Cypriot networks LTV, and Alfa TV, which re-signed with Nova.

Channels
Athina Sat offered over 30 channels in its line-up, from Greece, Europe and abroad as well as several FTA channels. The Current line-up of channels:

Foreign channels
BBC Entertainment
CNA
CNN International
Čarli TV
Cartoon Network
Eurosport 1
Eurosport 2
M2
TCM

Greek-language channels
902 TV
Alfa TV
ERT World
LTV
LTV Races
PIK Sat
Sigma TV
Skai TV
TV Magic
Vouli TV

References

External links
Official Site (in Greek & English)

Direct broadcast satellite services
Television in Cyprus